George Rix may refer to:
 George Rix (bishop)
 George Rix (trade unionist)